Bob Creech (born January 26, 1949) is a former NFL football player with the New Orleans Saints and the Philadelphia Eagles during the 1970s.

Creech attended Texas Christian University, where he played NCAA division one football. In the NFL, he participated in a total of 18 games, from 1971 to 1973, including 11 starts in 1972.

Personal life
Creech was born in Corpus Christi, Texas.

References

Philadelphia Eagles players
Living people
New Orleans Saints players
Sportspeople from Corpus Christi, Texas
American football linebackers
TCU Horned Frogs football players
1949 births